Frau Müller muss weg! is a 2015 German comedy film directed by Sönke Wortmann.

Cast 
 Gabriela Maria Schmeide - Frau Müller
 Justus von Dohnányi - Wolf Heider
 Anke Engelke - Jessica Höfel
 Ken Duken - Patrick Jeskow
 Mina Tander - Marina Jeskow
 Alwara Höfels - Katja Grabowski
  - Hausmeister
  - Hape Höfel
  - Heidrun Heider

References

External links 

2015 comedy films
German comedy films
Films directed by Sönke Wortmann
Films scored by Martin Todsharow
German films based on plays
Films about education
German satirical films
2010s German films
2010s German-language films